Modern Baseball (MoBo) was an American emo band from Philadelphia, Pennsylvania consisting of Bren Lukens, Jake Ewald, Sean Huber, and Ian Farmer. The band formed in 2012 at Drexel University and released their first album, Sports, on Lame-O Records that same year. Their following albums, You're Gonna Miss It All and Holy Ghost, were released on Run For Cover Records in 2014 and 2016 respectively. The group announced an indefinite hiatus in 2017.

History

Early years and success (2011–2016)
Bren Lukens and Jake Ewald met in High School, when Lukens was interested in Ewald's twin sister. They ran in different friend groups, but found common ground through music. Their name was inspired by a book that Lukens and Ewald found in Ewald’s basement, titled “Modern Baseball Techniques".

Originally from Brunswick, Maryland, they relocated to Philadelphia, Pennsylvania to attend college, with Lukens at Chestnut Hill College, and Ewald at Drexel University. In Philadelphia, they met fellow music lover Ian Farmer, who helped them record their first album, Sports, in Drexel's recording studios. Sports was released in 2012, and soon after the group left college temporarily to pursue music as their profession.

The band's first concert was in their shared house near Drexel University. The price of entry was either $3 or a picture of Michael Jordan. The house was later dubbed "The Michael Jordan House" which became a center for underground bands in the area. The music video for The Weekend was centered within the various.

The quartet started playing house shows around the area in the basement scene. They got introduced to fellow bands like The Menzingers, Lee Hartney, Ted Nguyent, and Cayetana. Around this time, the band also signed with upcoming label, Run For Cover Records. 

The group's second full-length album, You're Gonna Miss It All, was released on Run For Cover Records in 2014, reaching #97 on the Billboard 200. The group toured the United States in early 2014 with The Wonder Years. Modern Baseball toured the United Kingdom in September 2014. The band spoke ahead of their tour explaining how they manage their busy schedules. This followed a tour of the United States in a headlining spot with other bands Knuckle Puck, Foxing, Crying, and Somos.

In late 2015, the band announced plans for their third album that would be released in 2016 through Run For Cover Records, titled Holy Ghost. On February 25, 2016, the band announced that the album would be released on May 13 via Run For Cover and on Big Scary Monsters in the UK/Europe. Holy Ghost was produced by Joe Reinhart at Headroom Studios, in Philadelphia.

In May 2016, Modern Baseball embarked on The Holy Ghost Tour with Thin Lips and Joyce Manor. In fall 2016, Modern Baseball supported Brand New on tour along with The Front Bottoms. In December 2016, Ewald released the album Welcome as Slaughter Beach, Dog on Lame-O Records.

Hiatus (2017)
In January 2017, Bren Lukens released a statement saying that they would not be joining the band on their upcoming Europe/UK tour, instead opting to stay at home to focus on their mental and physical well-being. In February 2017 the band announced that they would be cancelling their US tour and taking a break to help protect their mental health and friendships.

The group played no shows in the spring of 2017, during which time Ewald and Farmer worked on producing Ewald's project Slaughter Beach, Dog, and Lukens and Huber worked on solo material. When interviewed in June 2017, Ewald remarked, "let's not call it a breakup and make a huge deal about it and have a 'Last Show Ever' or anything like that. Let's just take it easy for now, and if we wake up an[d] want to do it again, then let's do it." A few shows followed; in July 2017, Modern Baseball played a one-off show with Daniel Johnston as part of his final US tour, and in October 2017, the band played three consecutive shows in their hometown of Philadelphia. In an October 2017 interview, Ewald confirmed that the band had no plans to play any more shows for the indefinite future.

Musical style
The band's debut album Sports has been described as indie emo, folk punk, pop and pop punk. You're Gonna Miss It All has also been described as emo, folk rock, indie folk, indie rock, pop punk, power pop, and rock. Holy Ghost was described as emo and indie rock.

Members
 Bren Lukens – guitar, lead vocals 
 Jake Ewald – guitar, lead vocals
 Sean Huber – drums, backing vocals
 Ian Farmer – bass, backing vocals

Discography

Studio albums
Sports (2012)
You're Gonna Miss It All (2014)
Holy Ghost (2016)
Compilation albums
Techniques (2014)
Extended plays
The Nameless Ranger (2011)
Couples Therapy (2012)
Modern Baseball / The Hundred Acre Woods Split (2013)
MoBo Presents: The Perfect Cast Featuring Modern Baseball (2015)
Split 7" (Modern Baseball / Thin Lips / The Superweaks) (2017)

Videography

References

Indie rock musical groups from Pennsylvania
American emo musical groups
Musical groups from Philadelphia
Musical groups established in 2011
Run for Cover Records artists
2011 establishments in Pennsylvania
Lame-O Records artists